Israel was Patriarch of the Church of the East in 961.

Sources 
Brief accounts of Israel's short patriarchate are given in the Ecclesiastical Chronicle of the Jacobite writer Bar Hebraeus (floruit 1280) and in the ecclesiastical histories of the Nestorian writers Mari (twelfth-century), Amr (fourteenth-century) and Sliba (fourteenth-century).

Israel's patriarchate 
The following account of Israel's patriarchate is given by Bar Hebraeus:

Before this same year, namely the year 350 of the Arabs [AD 961/2], Israel, the successor of Emmanuel, was ordained catholicus, who had earlier been bishop of Kashkar.  For after the death of Emmanuel several people favoured Gabriel, the metropolitan of Fars, but the bishops did not accept him, saying, 'He is the brother of a man who recently embraced Islam and denied his faith.  It would bring great shame on us if we appointed as our chief the brother of such a man.'  And so everybody gave their consent to this Israel, and consecrated him catholicus at Seleucia.  He was venerable and chaste, but a doddering old man, and he died one hundred and six days after his consecration, at the age of ninety.

See also
 List of patriarchs of the Church of the East

Notes

References
 Abbeloos, J. B., and Lamy, T. J., Bar Hebraeus, Chronicon Ecclesiasticum (3 vols, Paris, 1877)
 Assemani, J. A., De Catholicis seu Patriarchis Chaldaeorum et Nestorianorum (Rome, 1775)
 Brooks, E. W., Eliae Metropolitae Nisibeni Opus Chronologicum (Rome, 1910)
 Gismondi, H., Maris, Amri, et Salibae: De Patriarchis Nestorianorum Commentaria I: Amri et Salibae Textus (Rome, 1896)
 Gismondi, H., Maris, Amri, et Salibae: De Patriarchis Nestorianorum Commentaria II: Maris textus arabicus et versio Latina (Rome, 1899)

External links 

Patriarchs of the Church of the East
10th-century bishops of the Church of the East
Nestorians in the Abbasid Caliphate